Mauro Raúl Fernández (born 31 March 1989) is an Argentine footballer who plays as a forward for Guillermo Brown. Fernández can play as either striker or winger on both flanks.

Honours

Club

Guillermo Brown

Torneo Argentino A (1): 2010–11

Peñarol

Uruguayan Primera División (1): 2012–13

Emelec

Ecuadorian Serie A (1): 2014

References

Mauro Fernandez nuevo jugador de Club Sport Emelec http://www.futbolizados.com/27851/oficial-el-argentino-mauro-fernandez-es-nuevo-jugador-de-emelec/

External links

1989 births
Living people
People from Puerto Madryn
Association football forwards
Argentine footballers
Argentine expatriate footballers
Guillermo Brown footballers
Estudiantes de La Plata footballers
FC Juárez footballers
Peñarol players
C.S. Emelec footballers
Club Deportivo Universidad de San Martín de Porres players
Tigres UANL footballers
Club Celaya footballers
Argentine Primera División players
Uruguayan Primera División players
Peruvian Primera División players
Ecuadorian Serie A players
Primera Nacional players
Argentine expatriate sportspeople in Ecuador
Argentine expatriate sportspeople in Uruguay
Argentine expatriate sportspeople in Peru
Argentine expatriate sportspeople in Mexico
Expatriate footballers in Ecuador
Expatriate footballers in Uruguay
Expatriate footballers in Peru
Expatriate footballers in Mexico